Mohammad Marashi (25 January 1944 – 15 May 2020) was a Syrian physician and lexicographer. His most notable work is Marashi's Grand Medical Dictionary, which was published in 2005.

Biography
Marashi was born in Aleppo, Syria, on 25 January 1944. He was educated at Damascus University, Faculty of Medicine, where he was awarded a Bachelor of Medicine, Bachelor of Surgery in 1970. He then specialized in obstetrics and gynecology between 1971 and 1976, and was licensed in 1977. He lived in Aleppo until August 2012, then moved to 6th of October City, Egypt until his death on 15 May 2020 in 6th of October City, Egypt.

Works
Marashi established Dar Al-Shifa Hospital in Aleppo in 1981 and worked as its director from 1982 to 1988. He also established Al-Maraashi Hospital in Aleppo in 1988. He also worked as a lecturer at the Health Institute in Aleppo from 1994 to 1997.

He published more than 5 books on medicine in Arabic and English, including 3 dictionaries:
 OBSTETRICS ILLUSTRATED, 1994.
 GYNAECOLOGY ILLUSTRATED, 1995.
 Marashi's Grand Medical Dictionary, 2005
 Marashi's Intermediate Medical Dictionary, 2002
 Marashi's Pocket Medical Dictionary, 2003

References

External links
 
 Marashi's Grand Medical Dictionary at Wayback Machine

People from Aleppo
Syrian physicians
Damascus University alumni
1944 births
2020 deaths
Syrian lexicographers